Bu-Fakhra is a Basic People's Congress administrative division of Benghazi, Libya. The area is named after a venerated saint in the area, whose tomb was once a popular visited site. As of 2012, the tomb was demolished by Salafists in the relative absence of law and order after the Libyan 2011 revolution.

References

Basic People's Congress divisions of Benghazi